The Lower Cape May Regional School District (LCMR School District) is regional public school district headquartered in Lower Township, New Jersey, United States, that serves students in seventh through twelfth grades through from four communities in Cape May County, including Lower Township, Cape May City and West Cape May, with students from Cape May Point attending as part of a sending/receiving relationship.

As of the 2020–21 school year, the district had two schools and had an enrollment of 1,262 students and 109.6 classroom teachers (on an FTE basis), for a student–teacher ratio of 11.5:1.

The district is classified by the New Jersey Department of Education as being in District Factor Group "B", the second lowest of eight groupings. District Factor Groups organize districts statewide to allow comparison by common socioeconomic characteristics of the local districts. From lowest socioeconomic status to highest, the categories are A, B, CD, DE, FG, GH, I and J.

History
The district was established in 1956. When the district was established, municipalities paid in proportion to how many students attended from each municipality. In 1975 the State of New Jersey established a new regional school district taxing regimen based on property values instead. This led to political conflict between the City of Cape May, which had relatively few students but pays a disproportionate share of the taxation revenue, versus Lower Township.

In January 1995 residents of the district voted in favor of a $4.99 million bond to expand the district facilities.

, the city of Cape May contributed $6.5 million in property taxes to cover the 67 students from the city attending the district, an average of $97,300 per student. Cape May officials have argued that the district's funding formula based on assessed property values unfairly penalizes Cape May, which has higher property values and a smaller number of high school students as a percentage of the population than the other constituent districts, especially Lower Township; Cape May has 6% of students while its share of property taxes for the district is one third. A change to base contributions on the number of students would cut property taxes in Cape May by $1,250 per home and in West Cape May by almost $1,100, while taxes for the average homeowner in Lower Township would increase by more than $400. In 2012, Cape May contributed $6 million in property taxes and sent 120 students to the regional district, an average of $50,000 per student. In 2013, the district received a proposal that had been prepared for the Cape May City Council that addressed concerns that the city's property tax base meant that it was paying a disproportionate share of the district's tax levy. Cape May raised possible means in which the imbalance could be addressed.

In 2013, the Lower Cape May Regional School District received a feasibility study that would look at ways to reconfigure the district. The study considered Cape May City withdrawing from the regional district or the dissolution of the district, converting the existing PreK-6 Lower Township School District to serve PreK-12, as the regional district's school facilities are located in the township. Cape May City and West Cape May could see annual savings approaching a combined $6 million from the dissolution.

in 2013 Richard Degener of The Press of Atlantic City wrote that the city government of Cape May "has been complaining for years about the city's share of the costs, and City Council recently hired an attorney to study the issue." In 2013 the city government asked the Cape May County Board of Education to have city voters vote on a new tax rate but the county board declined. In 2014 Degener stated that the city government of Cape May "is trying to leave the school system over what it claims are excessive costs".

In 2019 Chris Kobik, the superintendent, retired.

Schools and facilities

Schools in the district (with 2020–21 enrollment data from the National Center for Education Statistics) are:
Richard M. Teitelman Middle School with 480 students in grades 7 and 8
Gregory Lasher, Principal
It has a capacity of 701 students.
Lower Cape May Regional High School with 750 students in grades 9-12
Lawrence Ziemba, Principal

The LCMR district describes its facilities as being in Erma, with the postal address being "Cape May, New Jersey"; the schools are not in the Erma census-designated place. The Cape May County Herald, and the Press of Atlantic City describe the school complex as being in Erma.

Administration
Core members of the district's administration are:
Joseph Castellucci, Superintendent
Mark Mallett, Business Administrator / Board Secretary

Board of education
The district's board of education has nine members who set policy and oversee the fiscal and educational operation of the district through its administration. As a Type II school district, the board's trustees are elected directly by voters to serve three-year terms of office on a staggered basis, with three seats up for election each year held (since 2012) as part of the November general election. The board appoints a superintendent to oversee the day-to-day operation of the district. Seats on the board are allocated based on population, with Lower Township assigned seven seats and Cape May and West Cape May assigned one seat each.

Tax funding
The respective taxation rates differ for each of the three constituent municipalities (Cape May City, Lower Township, West Cape May Borough). The formulas are  derived from annual property evaluations, originating from a New Jersey state taxation formula. In 2012 the share of the budget was as follows: Lower Township: 57.6%, Cape May City, 34.2%, and West Cape May 8.3%. For 2013 it changed to Lower Township: 60.7%, Cape May City: 32.5%, and West Cape May: 6.8%.

 Cape May contributed about one third of the LCMR budget.

The district commissioned a company in Atlantic City, New Jersey to make an official LCMR flag with one for special events. A second was taken by an employee to Iraq, where he was called as a reservist.

Student body
In the 2008–2009 school year the LCMR district had 1,602 students from Lower Township. In the 2012–2013 school year the LCMR district had 1,356 students from Lower Township. The decline in the students from Lower Township was the primary reason for the decline in enrollment in LCMR schools.

Circa 2007–2012, the numbers of students from the Cape May School District attending LCMR schools ranged between 70 and 85, and the number of students from West Cape May School District for that period ranged between 45 and 58. Circa 2014 Cape May City had above 5% of the district's students.

In 2014 Cape May Point did not send any students to LCMR schools.

References

External links

Lower Cape May Regional School District

Data for the Lower Cape May Regional High School District, National Center for Education Statistics

1956 establishments in New Jersey
Cape May, New Jersey
Cape May Point, New Jersey
Lower Township, New Jersey
New Jersey District Factor Group B
School districts established in 1956
School districts in Cape May County, New Jersey
West Cape May, New Jersey